William Alfred Massey is an American mathematician and operations researcher, the Edwin S. Wilsey Professor of Operations Research and Financial Engineering at Princeton University. He is an expert in queueing theory.

Biography
Massey was born in Jefferson City, Missouri in 1956, the son of Juliette and Richard Massey Sr., both educators.
His family moved to St. Louis, Missouri when he was four. He went to college at Princeton University, graduating in 1977. Massey obtained his Ph.D. from Stanford University in 1981, with a thesis on queueing theory supervised by Joseph Keller. His first research publication was developed during a summer program at Bell Laboratories while he was a graduate student and was published in 1978. After earning his doctorate, he became a permanent staff member at Bell Labs. In 2001, Massey moved to his current position at Princeton, becoming the first African-American Princeton undergraduate alumnus to return as a faculty member.

Contributions
Massey has made many original contributions as a mathematician by developing a theory of “dynamical queueing systems”. Classical queueing models assumed that calling rates were constant so they could use the static, equilibrium analysis of time homogeneous Markov chains. However, real communication systems call for the large scale analysis of queueing models with time-varying rates. His thesis at Stanford University created a dynamic, asymptotic method for time inhomogeneous Markov chains called “uniform acceleration” to deal with such problems. Moreover, his research on queueing networks led to new methods of comparing multi-dimensional, Markov processes by viewing them as “stochastic orderings” on “partially ordered spaces”. Finally, one of his most cited papers develops an algorithm to find a dynamic, optimal server staffing schedule for telephone call centers with time varying demand, which led to a patent. Another highly cited paper creates a temporally and spatially dynamic model for the offered load traffic of wireless communication networks.

Awards and honors
In 2006, Massey won the Blackwell–Tapia Prize of the Institute for Mathematics and its Applications for his "outstanding record of achievement in mathematical research and his mentoring of minorities and women in the field of mathematics". He was elected to the 2006 class of Fellows of the Institute for Operations Research and the Management Sciences. In 2012 he became a fellow of the American Mathematical Society. Massey's accomplishments have earned him recognition by Mathematically Gifted & Black as a Black History Month 2018 Honoree.

References

External links
http://www.princeton.edu/~wmassey/ William A Massey Profile

Living people
African-American academics
Princeton University alumni
Princeton University faculty
Fellows of the American Mathematical Society
Fellows of the Institute for Operations Research and the Management Sciences
Mathematicians from Missouri
People from Jefferson City, Missouri
Scientists from Missouri
Scientists from St. Louis
Stanford University alumni
1956 births
21st-century African-American people
20th-century African-American people